Tom Arnold may refer to:

 Tom Arnold (actor) (born 1959), American actor
 Tom Arnold (economist) (born 1948), Irish CEO of Concern Worldwide
 Tom Arnold (footballer) (1878–?), English footballer
 Tom Arnold (literary scholar) (1823–1900), British academic, son of Thomas Arnold of Rugby
 Tom Arnold (politician) (born 1947), Conservative politician in the United Kingdom
 Tom Arnold (theatre impresario) (1897–1969), British theatrical producer

See also
 Thomas Arnold (disambiguation)